This is a list of 452 species in Ochthebius, a genus of minute moss beetles in the family Hydraenidae.

Ochthebius species

 Ochthebius abeillei Guillebeau, 1896 i c g
 Ochthebius adriaticus Reitter, 1886 i c g
 Ochthebius adventicius Jäch, 1990 i c g
 Ochthebius aeneus Stephens, 1835 i c g
 Ochthebius afghanicus Jäch, 1991 i c g
 Ochthebius aguilerai Ribera, Castro and Hernando, 2010 i c g
 Ochthebius ahni Jäch and Delgado, 2014 i c g
 Ochthebius akbuluti Jäch, Kasapoglu and Erman, 2003 i c g
 Ochthebius albacetinus Ferro, 1984 i c g
 Ochthebius albanicus (Orchymont, 1941) i c g
 Ochthebius algicola Wollaston, 1871 i c g
 Ochthebius alluaudi Régimbart, 1903 i c g
 Ochthebius almorenis Jäch, 1989 i c g
 Ochthebius alpheius Janssens, 1959 i c g
 Ochthebius alpinopetrus Perkins, 1980 i c g
 Ochthebius alpinus (Ienistea, 1979) i c g
 Ochthebius amami Yoshitomi and Satô, 2001 i c g
 Ochthebius amplicollis Champion, 1925 i c g
 Ochthebius amrishi Makhan, 2004 i c g
 Ochthebius anatolicus (Janssens, 1963) i c g
 Ochthebius anaxagoras Jäch, 1999 i c g
 Ochthebius anchorus Perkins, 2011 i c g
 Ochthebius andalusicus Jäch and Castro, 1999 i c g
 Ochthebius andraei Breit, 1920 i c g
 Ochthebius andreasi Jäch, 2003 i c g
 Ochthebius andreasoides Jäch, 2003 i c g
 Ochthebius andreinii Régimbart, 1905 i c g
 Ochthebius andronicus Orchymont, 1948 g
 Ochthebius andronius Orchymont, 1948 i c g
 Ochthebius angelinii Ferro, 2008 i c g
 Ochthebius angularidus Perkins, 1980 i c g
 Ochthebius angusi Jäch, 1994 i c g
 Ochthebius annae Ferro, 1979 i c g
 Ochthebius anxifer Balfour-Browne, 1978 i c g
 Ochthebius apache Perkins, 1980 i c g
 Ochthebius apicalis Sharp, 1882 i c g
 Ochthebius arabicus Jäch, 1992 i c g
 Ochthebius arator Ertorun and Jäch, 2014 i c g
 Ochthebius arefniae Jäch and Delgado, 2008 i c g
 Ochthebius arenicolus Perkins, 1980 i c g
 Ochthebius argentatus Jäch, 2003 i c g
 Ochthebius aristoteles Jäch, 1999 i c g
 Ochthebius arizonicus Perkins, 1980 i c g
 Ochthebius asanoae Jäch and Delgado, 2014 i c g
 Ochthebius asiobatoides Jäch, 2003 i c g
 Ochthebius asperatus Jäch, 2003 i c g
 Ochthebius atratulus Régimbart, 1905 i c g
 Ochthebius atricapillus Reitter, 1901 i c g
 Ochthebius atriceps Fairmaire, 1879 i c g
 Ochthebius attritus LeConte, 1878 i c g
 Ochthebius auriculatus Rey, 1886 i c g
 Ochthebius auropallens Fairmaire, 1879 i c g
 Ochthebius avdati Delgado and Jäch, 2007 i c g
 Ochthebius aztecus Sharp, 1887 i c g
 Ochthebius bactrianus Janssens, 1962 i c g
 Ochthebius balcanicus (Ienistea, 1988) i c g
 Ochthebius balfourbrownei Jäch, 1989 i c g
 Ochthebius basilicatus Fiori, 1915 i c g
 Ochthebius batesoni Blair, 1933 i c g
 Ochthebius bellieri Kuwert, 1887 i c g
 Ochthebius bellstedti Jäch, 1992 i c g
 Ochthebius belucistanicus Ferro, 1984 i c g
 Ochthebius benefossus LeConte, 1878 i c g
 Ochthebius bernhardi Jäch and Delgado, 2008 i c g
 Ochthebius bicolon Germar, 1824 i c g
 Ochthebius bicomicus Perkins, 2011 i c g
 Ochthebius bifoveolatus Waltl, 1835 i c g
 Ochthebius biincisus Perkins, 1980 i c g
 Ochthebius bisinuatus Perkins, 1980 i c g
 Ochthebius boeotianus (Ienistea, 1988) i c g
 Ochthebius bonnairei Guillebeau, 1896 i c g
 Ochthebius borealis Perkins, 1980 i c g
 Ochthebius brevicollis (Baudi, 1864) i c g
 Ochthebius brevipennis Perkins, 1980 i c g
 Ochthebius browni Perkins, 1980 i c g
 Ochthebius bupunctus Perkins, 2011 i c g
 Ochthebius caesaraugustae Jäch, Ribera and Aguilera, 1998 i c g
 Ochthebius californicus Perkins, 1980 i c g
 Ochthebius caligatus Jäch, 2003 i c g
 Ochthebius cameroni Balfour-Browne, 1951 i c g
 Ochthebius cantabricus Balfour-Browne, 1978 i c g
 Ochthebius capicola (Péringuey, 1892) i c g
 Ochthebius caspius Jäch, 1992 i c g
 Ochthebius castellanus Jäch, 2003 i c g
 Ochthebius caucasicus Kuwert, 1887 i c g
 Ochthebius caudatus Frivaldszky, 1883 i c g
 Ochthebius celatus Jäch, 1989 i c g
 Ochthebius championi (Jäch, 1989) i c g
 Ochthebius chappuisi Orchymont, 1948 i c g
 Ochthebius ciffidilis Ferro, 1984 i c g
 Ochthebius ciliciae Jäch, 1989 i c g
 Ochthebius colchicus Janssens, 1963 i c g
 Ochthebius colveranus (Ferro, 1979) i c g
 Ochthebius confusus Ferro, 1990 i c g
 Ochthebius coomani Orchymont, 1925 i c g
 Ochthebius corcyraeus Jäch, 1990 i c g
 Ochthebius corrugatus Rosenhauer, 1856 i c g
 Ochthebius corsicus Sainte-Claire Deville, 1908 i c g
 Ochthebius costatellus Reitter, 1897 i c g
 Ochthebius costipennis Fall, 1901 i c g
 Ochthebius crassalus Perkins, 1980 i c g
 Ochthebius crenatus Hatch, 1965 i c g
 Ochthebius crenulatus Mulsant and Rey, 1850 i c g
 Ochthebius cribricollis LeConte, 1850 i c g
 Ochthebius cuprescens Guillebeau, 1893 i c g
 Ochthebius cupricollis Sahlberg, 1903 i c g
 Ochthebius cyprensis Kuwert, 1890 i c g
 Ochthebius cyrenaeus Ferro, 1985 i c g
 Ochthebius czwalinae Kuwert, 1887 i c g
 Ochthebius czwalinai Kuwert, 1887 g
 Ochthebius dalmatinus Ganglbauer, 1904 i c g
 Ochthebius danjo Nakane, 1990 i c g
 Ochthebius darius Balfour-Browne, 1979 i c g
 Ochthebius decianus Orchymont, 1942 i c g
 Ochthebius delgadoi Jäch, 1994 i c g
 Ochthebius delhiensis Jäch, 1992 i c g
 Ochthebius delyi (Hebauer, 1990) i c g
 Ochthebius dentifer Rey, 1885 i c g
 Ochthebius depressionis Jäch, 1991 i c g
 Ochthebius depressus Sahlberg, 1900 i c g
 Ochthebius diazi Jäch, 1999 i c g
 Ochthebius difficilis Mulsant, 1844 i c g
 Ochthebius dilatatus Stephens, 1829 i c g
 Ochthebius dilucidus Orchymont, 1940 i c g
 Ochthebius discretus LeConte, 1878 i c g
 Ochthebius eburneus Sahlberg, 1900 i c g
 Ochthebius elburzi Ferro, 1987 i c g
 Ochthebius elisae Sahlberg, 1900 i c g
 Ochthebius emilianus (Ienistea, 1988) i c g
 Ochthebius empedocles Jäch, 1999 i c g
 Ochthebius endroedyi Perkins, 2011 i c g
 Ochthebius enicoceroides Jäch, 2003 i c g
 Ochthebius erzerumi Kuwert, 1887 i c g
 Ochthebius evanescens Sahlberg, 1875 i c g
 Ochthebius exiguus Jäch, 2003 i c g
 Ochthebius exsculptus (Germar, 1824) i c g
 Ochthebius extremus (Péringuey, 1892) i c g
 Ochthebius eyrei Jäch, 1990 i c g
 Ochthebius falcatus Jäch, 1991 i c g
 Ochthebius fallacioviridis Ienistea, 1988 i c g
 Ochthebius fausti Sharp, 1887 i c g
 Ochthebius faustinus Orchymont, 1940 i c g
 Ochthebius ferganensis Jäch, 1990 i c g
 Ochthebius ferroi Fresneda, Lagar & Hernando, 1993 g
 Ochthebius figueroi Garrido Gonzalez, Valladares Diez and Régil Cueto, 1991 i c g
 Ochthebius fissicollis Janssens, 1969 i c g
 Ochthebius flagellifer Jäch, 2003 i c g
 Ochthebius flavipes Dalla Torre, 1877 i c g
 Ochthebius flexus Pu, 1958 i c g
 Ochthebius flumineus Orchymont, 1937 i c g
 Ochthebius formosanus Jäch, 1998 i c g
 Ochthebius fossulatus Mulsant, 1844 i c g
 Ochthebius foveolatus Germar, 1824 i c g
 Ochthebius freyi Orchymont, 1940 i c g
 Ochthebius fujianensis Jäch, 2003 i c g
 Ochthebius furcatus Pu, 1958 i c g
 Ochthebius gagliardii Orchymont, 1940 i c g
 Ochthebius gauthieri Peyerimhoff, 1924 i c g
 Ochthebius gayosoi Jach, 2001 g
 Ochthebius gereckei Jäch, 1993 i c g
 Ochthebius gestroi Gridelli, 1926 g
 Ochthebius gibbosus (Germar, 1824) i c g
 Ochthebius glaber Montes and Soler, 1988 i c g
 Ochthebius gonggashanensis Jäch, 2003 i c g
 Ochthebius grandipennis Fairmaire, 1879 i c g
 Ochthebius granulatus (Mulsant, 1844) i c g
 Ochthebius granulinus Perkins, 2011 i c g
 Ochthebius granulosus Jäch and Delgado, 2014 i c g
 Ochthebius gruwelli Perkins, 1980 i c g
 Ochthebius guangdongensis Jäch, 2003 i c g
 Ochthebius haberfelneri Reitter, 1890 i c g
 Ochthebius haelii Ferro, 1983 i c g
 Ochthebius hainanensis Jäch, 2003 i c g
 Ochthebius hajeki Jäch and Delgado, 2014 i c g
 Ochthebius halbherri (Reitter, 1890) i c g
 Ochthebius halophilus Ertorun and Jäch, 2014 i c g
 Ochthebius hanshebaueri Jäch, 1994 i c g
 Ochthebius hasegawai Nakane and Matsui, 1986 i c g
 Ochthebius hatayensis Jäch, 1989 i c g
 Ochthebius hauseri Jäch, 1992 i c g
 Ochthebius hayashii Jäch and Delgado, 2014 i c g
 Ochthebius hebaueri Jäch, 1983 i c g
 Ochthebius heeri (Wollaston, 1854) i c g
 Ochthebius hellenicus (Ienistea, 1988) i c g
 Ochthebius hesperides Balfour-Browne, 1976 i c g
 Ochthebius heydeni Kuwert, 1887 i c g
 Ochthebius hibernus Perkins, 1980 i c g
 Ochthebius himalayae Jäch, 1989 i c g
 Ochthebius hivae Jäch, Irani and Delgado, 2013 i c g
 Ochthebius hofratvukovitsi Jäch, 1994 i c g
 Ochthebius hokkaidensis Jäch, 1998 i c g
 Ochthebius huberti Jäch, 1989 i c g
 Ochthebius hungaricus Endrödy-Younga, 1967 i c g
 Ochthebius hyblaemajoris Ferro, 1986 i c g
 Ochthebius ilanensis Jäch, 1998 i c g
 Ochthebius imbensimbi Jäch, 1989 i c g
 Ochthebius immaculatus Breit, 1908 i c g
 Ochthebius impressipennis Rey, 1886 i c g
 Ochthebius inconspicuus Jäch, 1991 i c g
 Ochthebius indicus (Ienistea, 1988) i c g
 Ochthebius inelegans Jäch, 2002 i c g
 Ochthebius inermis Sharp, 1884 i c g
 Ochthebius innexus Balfour-Browne, 1951 i c g
 Ochthebius insidiosus Jäch, 1999 i c g
 Ochthebius interruptus LeConte, 1852 i c g
 Ochthebius involatus Perkins, 2011 i c g
 Ochthebius iranicus Balfour-Browne, 1979 i c g
 Ochthebius irenae Ribera and Millán, 1999 i c g
 Ochthebius italicus Jäch, 1990 i c g
 Ochthebius iternuptialis Jach, 2001 g
 Ochthebius izmiranus (Ienistea, 1988) i c g
 Ochthebius jaimei Delgado and Jäch, 2007 i c g
 Ochthebius janssensi Ferro, 1983 i c g
 Ochthebius japonicus Jäch, 1998 i c g
 Ochthebius javieri Jäch, 2000 i c g
 Ochthebius jengi Jäch, 1998 i c g
 Ochthebius jermakovi Orchymont, 1933 i c g
 Ochthebius jilanzhui Jäch, 2003 i c g
 Ochthebius joosti Jäch, 1992 i c g
 Ochthebius judemaesi Delgado and Jäch, 2007 i c g
 Ochthebius kaninensis Poppius, 1909 i c g
 Ochthebius karasui Ferro, 1986 i c g
 Ochthebius khnzoriani Janssens, 1974 i c g
 Ochthebius khuzestanicus Ferro, 1982 i c g
 Ochthebius kieneri Jäch, 1999 i c g
 Ochthebius kiesenwetteri Kuwert, 1887 i c g
 Ochthebius kirschenhoferi Jäch, 1994 i c g
 Ochthebius klapperichi Jäch, 1989 i c g
 Ochthebius kosiensis Champion, 1920 i c g
 Ochthebius kurdistanicus Jäch, 1989 i c g
 Ochthebius kuwerti Reitter, 1897 i c g
 Ochthebius lacustatta Jäch, 1991 i c g
 Ochthebius laevisculptus Reitter, 1901 i c g
 Ochthebius lanarotis Ferro, 1985 i c g
 Ochthebius lanuginosus Reiche and Saulcy, 1856 i c g
 Ochthebius lapidicola Wollaston, 1864 i c g
 Ochthebius laticollis Pankow, 1986 i c g
 Ochthebius latinorum (Ienistea, 1988) i c g
 Ochthebius lecontei Perkins, 1980 i c g
 Ochthebius lederi Jäch, 1990 i c g
 Ochthebius leechi Wood and Perkins, 1978 i c g
 Ochthebius legionensis (Hebauer and Valladares Diez, 1985) i c g
 Ochthebius lejolisii Mulsant and Rey, 1861 i c g
 Ochthebius lenensis Poppius, 1907 i c g
 Ochthebius lenkoranus Reitter, 1885 i c g
 Ochthebius levantinus Jäch, 1989 i c g
 Ochthebius libanus Jäch and Díaz, 1992 i c g
 Ochthebius limbicollis Reitter, 1885 i c g
 Ochthebius lineatus LeConte, 1852 i c g b
 Ochthebius lividipennis Peyron, 1858 i c g
 Ochthebius lobatus Pu, 1958 i c g
 Ochthebius lobicollis Rey, 1885 i c g
 Ochthebius lucanus Ferro, 1990 i c g
 Ochthebius lurugosus Jäch, 1998 i c g
 Ochthebius maculatus Reiche, 1869 i c g
 Ochthebius madli Jäch, 1992 i c g
 Ochthebius madrensis Perkins, 1980 i c g
 Ochthebius magnannulatus Delgado and Jäch, 2009 i c g
 Ochthebius malaganus Ienistea, 1988 i c g
 Ochthebius mamagri (Shatrovskiy, 1989) i c g
 Ochthebius marginalis Rey, 1886 i c g
 Ochthebius marijanmatoki Jäch and Delgado, 2015 i c g
 Ochthebius marinus (Paykull, 1798) i c g b  (marine moss beetle)
 Ochthebius maroccanus Jäch, 1992 i c g
 Ochthebius martini Fall, 1919 i c g
 Ochthebius masatakasatoi Jäch, 1992 i c g
 Ochthebius matsudae Jäch and Delgado, 2014 i c g
 Ochthebius mauretanicus Jäch, 1990 i c g
 Ochthebius maxfischeri Jäch, 1999 i c g
 Ochthebius mediterraneus (Ienistea, 1988) i c g
 Ochthebius melanescens (Dalla Torre, 1877) i c g
 Ochthebius meridionalis Rey, 1885 i c g
 Ochthebius merinidicus Ferro, 1985 i c g
 Ochthebius mesoamericanus Perkins, 1980 i c g
 Ochthebius metallescens Rosenhauer, 1847 i c g
 Ochthebius metallicus Orchymont, 1942 i c g
 Ochthebius metarius Orchymont, 1942 i c g
 Ochthebius metellus Orchymont, 1942 i c g
 Ochthebius mexcavatus Perkins, 1980 i c g
 Ochthebius mexicanus Perkins, 1980 i c g
 Ochthebius micans Balfour-Browne, 1951 i c g
 Ochthebius mimicus Brown, 1933 i c g
 Ochthebius minabensis Ferro, 1983 i c g
 Ochthebius minervius Orchymont, 1940 i c g
 Ochthebius minimus (Fabricius, 1792) i c g
 Ochthebius mongolensis Janssens, 1967 i c g
 Ochthebius mongolicus Janssens, 1967 i c g
 Ochthebius montanus Frivaldszky, 1881 i c g
 Ochthebius montenegrinus (Ganglbauer, 1901) i c g
 Ochthebius montesi Ferro, 1984 i c g
 Ochthebius monticola Orchymont, 1948 i c g
 Ochthebius monychus Orchymont, 1941 i c g
 Ochthebius morettii Pirisinu, 1974 i c g
 Ochthebius mutatus Jäch, 1991 i c g
 Ochthebius nakanei Matsui, 1986 i c g
 Ochthebius namibiensis Perkins and Balfour-Browne, 1994 i c g
 Ochthebius nanus Stephens, 1829 i c g
 Ochthebius naxianus (Ienistea, 1988) i c g
 Ochthebius nepalensis Jäch, 1989 i c g
 Ochthebius nigrasperulus Jäch, 2003 i c g
 Ochthebius nilssoni Hebauer, 1986 i c g
 Ochthebius nipponicus Jäch, 1998 i c g
 Ochthebius nitidipennis (Champion, 1920) i c g
 Ochthebius nobilis Villa and Villa, 1835 i c g
 Ochthebius nonaginta Jäch, 1998 i c g
 Ochthebius normandi Jäch, 1992 i c g
 Ochthebius notabilis Rosenhauer, 1856 i c g
 Ochthebius obesus Jäch, 2003 i c g
 Ochthebius obscurometallescens Ienistea, 1988 i c g
 Ochthebius octofoveatus Pu, 1958 i c g
 Ochthebius oezkani Jäch, Kasapoglu and Erman, 2003 i c g
 Ochthebius olicinium Jäch, 1990 i c g
 Ochthebius opacipennis Champion, 1920 i c g
 Ochthebius opacus Baudi, 1882 i c g
 Ochthebius orbus Perkins, 1980 i c g
 Ochthebius orientalis Janssens, 1962 i c g
 Ochthebius otavalensis Anderson, 1983 i c g
 Ochthebius ovatus Jäch, 1989 i c g
 Ochthebius pacificus Perkins, 1980 i c g
 Ochthebius pagotrichus Perkins and Balfour-Browne, 1994 i c g
 Ochthebius pakistanicus Delgado and Jäch, 2009 i c g
 Ochthebius pallidulus Kuwert, 1887 i c g
 Ochthebius parki Jäch and Delgado, 2014 i c g
 Ochthebius parvannulatus Delgado and Jäch, 2009 i c g
 Ochthebius pauli Perkins, 1980 i c g
 Ochthebius pedalis Balfour-Browne, 1954 i c g
 Ochthebius pedicularius Kuwert, 1887 i c g
 Ochthebius pedroi Jäch, 2000 i c g
 Ochthebius peisonis Ganglbauer, 1901 i c g
 Ochthebius perdurus Reitter, 1899 i c g
 Ochthebius peregrinus Orchymont, 1941 i c g
 Ochthebius perkinsi Pankow, 1986 i c g
 Ochthebius perpusillus Ferro, 1985 i c g
 Ochthebius pierottii Ferro, 1979 i c g
 Ochthebius pilosus Waltl, 1835 i c g
 Ochthebius pliginskiyi Jäch, 1990 i c g
 Ochthebius ponticus Ienistea, 1956 i c g
 Ochthebius poweri Rye, 1869 i c g
 Ochthebius praetermissus Jäch, 1991 i c g
 Ochthebius preissi Jach, 2001 g
 Ochthebius pretneri Jäch, 1999 i c g
 Ochthebius pseudoviridis Ienistea, 1988 i c g
 Ochthebius puberulus Reitter, 1885 i c g
 Ochthebius pudilaceris Ferro, 1982 i c g
 Ochthebius pui Perkins, 1979 i c g
 Ochthebius punctatoides Jäch, 1994 i c g
 Ochthebius punctatus Stephens, 1829 i c g
 Ochthebius puncticollis LeConte, 1852 i c g b
 Ochthebius pusillus Stephens, 1835 i c g
 Ochthebius putnamensis Blatchley, 1910 i c g
 Ochthebius quadricollis Mulsant, 1844 i c g
 Ochthebius quadrifossulatus Waltl, 1835 i c g
 Ochthebius quadrifoveolatus Wollaston, 1854 i c g
 Ochthebius queenslandicus Hansen, 1998 i c g
 Ochthebius ragusae Kuwert, 1887 i c g
 Ochthebius recticulus Perkins, 1980 i c g
 Ochthebius rectilobus Jäch, 1989 i c g
 Ochthebius rectus LeConte, 1878 i c g
 Ochthebius rectusalsus Perkins, 1980 i c g
 Ochthebius recurvatus Jäch, 1991 i c g
 Ochthebius regimbarti Knisch, 1924 i c g
 Ochthebius remotus Reitter, 1885 i c g
 Ochthebius reticulocostus Perkins, 1980 i c g
 Ochthebius richmondi Perkins, 1980 i c g
 Ochthebius rivalis Champion, 1920 i c g
 Ochthebius rivibelli Jäch, 1990 i c g
 Ochthebius romanicus Ienistea, 1968 i c g
 Ochthebius rotundatus Jäch, 2003 i c g
 Ochthebius rubripes Boheman, 1860 i c g
 Ochthebius rugulosus Wollaston, 1857 i c g
 Ochthebius saboorii Skale and Jäch, 2009 i c g
 Ochthebius salebrosus Pu, 1958 i c g
 Ochthebius salinarius Balfour-Browne, 1954 i c g
 Ochthebius salinator Peyerimhoff, 1924 i c g
 Ochthebius sanabrensis Valladares and Jäch, 2008 i c g
 Ochthebius sardus Jäch, 1990 i c g
 Ochthebius satoi Nakane, 1965 i c g
 Ochthebius sattmanni (Jäch, 1992) i c g
 Ochthebius schneideri Kuwert, 1887 i c g
 Ochthebius schoedli Jäch, 1999 i c g
 Ochthebius schuberti Jäch, 1999 i c g
 Ochthebius scintillans Champion, 1920 i c g
 Ochthebius scitulus Ferro, 1982 i c g
 Ochthebius sculptoides Perkins, 1980 i c g
 Ochthebius sculpturatus Sahlberg, 1900 i c g
 Ochthebius sculptus LeConte, 1878 i c g
 Ochthebius semisericeus Sainte-Claire Deville, 1914 i c g
 Ochthebius semotus d'Orchymont, 1942 g
 Ochthebius sempronius Orchymont, 1942 i c g
 Ochthebius sennius d'Orchymont, 1942 g
 Ochthebius serpentinus Jäch, 1989 i c g
 Ochthebius serratus Rosenhauer, 1856 i c g
 Ochthebius sexfoveatus Champion, 1920 i c g
 Ochthebius sharpi Jäch, 1992 i c g
 Ochthebius sichuanensis Jäch, 2003 i c g
 Ochthebius siculus Kuwert, 1887 i c g
 Ochthebius sidanus Orchymont, 1942 i c g
 Ochthebius sierrensis Perkins, 1980 i c g
 Ochthebius silfverbergi Jäch, 1992 i c g
 Ochthebius similis Sharp, 1882 i c g
 Ochthebius sitiensis Perkins, 2011 i c g
 Ochthebius smyrnensis Sahlberg, 1908 i c g
 Ochthebius spanglerorum Wood and Perkins, 1978 i c g
 Ochthebius spatulus Balfour-Browne, 1954 i c g
 Ochthebius speculator Jäch, 1991 i c g
 Ochthebius spinasus Perkins and Balfour-Browne, 1994 i c g
 Ochthebius stastnyi Jäch, 2003 i c g
 Ochthebius striatus (Castelnau, 1840) i c g
 Ochthebius strigoides Jäch, 1998 i c g
 Ochthebius strigosus Champion, 1921 i c g
 Ochthebius stygialis Orchymont, 1937 i c g
 Ochthebius subaeneus Janssens, 1967 i c g
 Ochthebius subinteger Mulsant and Rey, 1861 i c g
 Ochthebius subopacus Reitter, 1885 i c g
 Ochthebius subpictus Wollaston, 1857 i c g
 Ochthebius subviridis Ienistea, 1988 i c g
 Ochthebius sulpuris Jäch, 1989 i c g
 Ochthebius sumatrensis Jäch, 2001 i c g
 Ochthebius tacapasensis Ferro, 1983 i c g
 Ochthebius tadilatus Jäch, 1990 i c g
 Ochthebius thermalis Janssens, 1965 i c g
 Ochthebius thraciae Jäch, 1990 i c g
 Ochthebius tivelunus Ferro, 1984 i c g
 Ochthebius trapezuntinus Jäch, 1999 i c g
 Ochthebius tubus Perkins, 1980 i c g
 Ochthebius tudmirensis Jäch, 1997 i c g
 Ochthebius tunisicus Jäch, 1997 i c g
 Ochthebius turcicus Jäch, 1989 i c g
 Ochthebius turcmeniae Jäch, 1990 i c g
 Ochthebius turkestanus Kuwert, 1892 i c g
 Ochthebius uniformis Perkins, 1980 i c g
 Ochthebius unimaculatus Pu, 1958 i c g
 Ochthebius urbanelliae (Audisio et al., 2009) i c g
 Ochthebius uskubensis Hebauer, 1986 i c g
 Ochthebius ustaoglui Topkara, Jäch and Kasapoglu, 2011 i c g
 Ochthebius vedovai Ferro, 1987 i c g
 Ochthebius velutinus Fairmaire, 1883 i c g
 Ochthebius verrucosus Pu, 1942 i c g
 Ochthebius viganoi Pirisinu, 1974 i c g
 Ochthebius virens Jäch, 1992 i c g
 Ochthebius virgula Ferro, 1986 i c g
 Ochthebius viridescens Ienistea, 1988 i c g
 Ochthebius viridis Peyron, 1858 i c g
 Ochthebius wangmiaoi Jäch, 2003 i c g
 Ochthebius wewalkai Jäch, 1984 i c g
 Ochthebius wuzhishanensis Jäch, 2003 i c g
 Ochthebius yaanensis Jäch, 2003 i c g
 Ochthebius yoshitomii Jäch and Delgado, 2014 i c g
 Ochthebius yumiae Matsui and Delgado, 1997 i c g
 Ochthebius yunnanensis Orchymont, 1925 i c g
 Ochthebius zugmayeri Kniz, 1909 i c g
 Ochthebius zulu Perkins, 2011 i c g

Data sources: i = ITIS, c = Catalogue of Life, g = GBIF, b = Bugguide.net

References

Ochthebius
Articles created by Qbugbot